Hans-Jürgen Helbig (born 25 November 1955) is a German sports shooter. He competed in the mixed 50 metre running target event at the 1980 Summer Olympics.

References

External links
 

1955 births
Living people
German male sport shooters
Olympic shooters of East Germany
Shooters at the 1980 Summer Olympics
People from Altenburg
Sportspeople from Thuringia